Djuras may refer to:
 Djurås, a locality and the seat of Gagnef Municipality in Dalarna County, Sweden
 Đuraš, a Serbian masculine given name